National Agency for Quality Assurance in Higher Education of Ukraine is the regulator of higher education of Ukraine. It was created in connection with Institute of Higher Education of NAPS of Ukraine and its scientific community.

History 

The Agency was established in 2015. The Agency consists of 23 members and is formed on a quota basis (no more than one person from the field of knowledge): three representatives of all-Ukrainian associations of employers' organizations; two from the number of first- or second-level higher education graduates; at least one representative from the following organisations: National Academy of Sciences of Ukraine; National Branch Academy of Sciences; state-owned institutions of higher education; institutions of higher education under communal ownership, institutions of higher education under private ownership.

Personalities 

 Sergiy Kurbatov
 Inna Sovsun

References

Sources 
 Ukraine Higher Education Leadership Development Programme

Higher education in Ukraine